Fink is the second album by the Swamp Zombies and was released in 1989 under the Doctor Dream Records label.

Track listing
Mr. Freako
We Just Don't Belong	
Zipper
We Got Five Bucks
Big Black Shoes
Victor
Mr. Hate
Land Of 1000 Beers
Dig A Hole In The Love...
Crawfish
Cold Fables
You Always Think
Now It's Gone
Denny's Incident

Swamp Zombies albums
1989 albums